"The Best I Know How" is a song written by Kim Reid, and recorded by American country music group The Statler Brothers.  It was released in February 1988 as the third single from the album Maple Street Memories.  The song reached #15 on the Billboard Hot Country Singles & Tracks chart.

Charts

References

1988 singles
1987 songs
The Statler Brothers songs
Song recordings produced by Jerry Kennedy
Mercury Records singles